Figure skating at the 2022 Winter Olympics was held at the Capital Indoor Stadium in Beijing, China. The five events took place between 4 and 20 February 2022.

A total of 144 quota spots were distributed to the sport of figure skating, a decline of four from the 2018 Olympic Winter Games. From the 2021–22 season, the International Skating Union renamed "ladies' singles" as "women's singles".

A total of five events were contested, one for men, one for women and three mixed.

Qualification 

A total of 144 quota spots are available to athletes to compete at the games. Each NOC can enter a maximum of 18 athletes, with a maximum of nine men or nine women. An additional five quota spots have been made available for, first host qualification, then if any are remaining, the team event.

On the issue of the disqualification of participating athletes at the Winter Olympics, the ISU has issued a statement regarding its policy regarding doping violations which may be alleged for the duration of the events of the Games stating that the, "...International Skating Union cannot disclose any information about a possible anti-doping rule violation. This is regulated by the ISU anti-doping rules and the IOC anti-doping rules for the Beijing 2022 Olympics."

Competition schedule
The following is the competition schedule for all five events. Sessions that include the event finals are shown in bold.

All times are in local time (UTC+8), according to the official schedule correct as of January 2022. This schedule may be subject to change in due time.

Medal summary

Medal table

Events 

 Skaters who only competed in the short program/rhythm dance.
 Skaters who only competed in the free skating/dance.

Entries
Countries began announcing their selections following the 2021 World Championships. The International Skating Union published a complete list of entries on 26 January 2022. Names denoted with an asterisk (*) are skaters/teams eligible for the team event only.

Changes to preliminary assignments

Records and firsts 

The following new ISU best scores were set during this competition.

TES = Technical Element ScorePCS = Program Component Score

The following first achievements set during this competition.

Participating nations 
The following National Olympic Committees earned spots to compete, with the number of athletes in parentheses. 148 athletes from 32 NOCs are expected to participate. ROC was the only delegation to qualify the maximum number of entries (3 spots per discipline for 18 athletes total).

  (2)
  (2)
  (3)
  (2)
  (2)
  (1)
  (1)
  (13)
  (8)
  (6)
  (2)
  (3)
  (4)
  (6)
  (6)
  (3)
  (2)
  (3)
  (9)
  (10)
  (1)
  (2)
  (1)
  (1)
  (3)
  (18)
  (4)
  (4)
  (2)
  (2)
  (6)
  (16)

Controversy surrounding the ROC

The medal ceremony for the team event, where the ROC won gold, originally scheduled for 8 February, was delayed over what International Olympic Committee (IOC) spokesperson Mark Adams described as a situation that required "legal consultation" with the International Skating Union. Several media outlets reported on 9 February that the issue was over a positive test for trimetazidine by the ROC's Kamila Valieva, which was officially confirmed on 11 February. Valieva's sample in question was taken by the Russian Anti-Doping Agency (RUSADA) at the 2022 Russian Figure Skating Championships on 25 December, but the sample was not analyzed at the World Anti-Doping Agency (WADA) laboratory where it was sent for testing until 8 February, one day after the team event concluded.

Valieva was assessed a provisional suspension after her positive result, but upon appeal, she was cleared by RUSADA's independent Disciplinary Anti-Doping Committee (DAC) on 9 February, just a day after receiving the provisional suspension. Following formal appeals lodged by the IOC, the International Skating Union (ISU), and WADA to review RUSADA DAC's decision, the Court of Arbitration for Sport (CAS) heard the case on 13 February, and removal of her provisional suspension was upheld on 14 February, ahead of her scheduled appearance in the women's singles event beginning 15 February. Due to Valieva being a minor at the time, as well as being classified as a "protected person" under WADA guidelines, RUSADA and the IOC announced on 12 February that they would broaden the scope of their respective investigations to include members of her entourage (e.g. coaches, team doctors, etc.).

On 14 February, the CAS declined to reinstate Valieva's provisional suspension and ruled that she would be allowed to compete in the women’s singles event. The CAS decided that preventing her from competing "would cause her irreparable harm in the circumstances", while noting that any medals won by Valieva at the Beijing Olympics would be withheld pending the results of the continuing investigation into her doping violation. The accommodating decision from the court, still subject to further and on-going investigation, was made on three grounds: 1/ Due to her age, she is a "Protected Person" as per WADA Code, subject to different rules than adult athletes; 2/ Athlete "did not test positive during the Olympic Games in Beijing; 3/ "There were serious issues of untimely notification of the results, ... which impinged upon the Athlete’s ability to establish certain legal requirements for her benefit". The IOC announced that the team event medal ceremony, as well as the women's singles flower ceremony and medal ceremony if Valieva were to medal, would not take place until the investigation is over, and there is a concrete decision whether to strip Valieva and the ROC of their medals. To allow for the possibility that Valieva's results may be disqualified, the IOC asked the ISU to expand the qualifying field for the women's singles free skating by one to 25, contingent upon Valieva being one of the top 24 skaters after the short program.

On 15 February, after the women's short program, The New York Times reported that Valieva's sample tested positive for an additional two substances, hypoxen and L-Carnitine, which are not on the banned list, in addition to trimetazidine. Antidoping officials called the discovery of multiple substances in any athlete's sample "highly unusual", particularly in an athlete as young as Valieva. Travis Tygart, the chief executive of the United States Anti-Doping Agency, called the combination of three heart medications a "trifecta of substances...[which] seem to be aimed at increasing endurance, reducing fatigue and promoting greater efficiency in using oxygen". By the end of the Beijing Olympics, a total five athletes were reported for doping violations. By 9 March 2022, Tygart of the USADA further reported that Valieva had not requested that her "B" sample be tested, apparently accepting the results of initial testing and relying on her explanation that the banned substance trimetazidine belonged to her grandfather and only accidentally contaminated or became mixed into her own use of allowed nutrients and supplements. Tygart further stated that as a minor Valieva could still be either fully exculpated or given a warning concerning her testing positive depending on the extent of findings in the on-going RUSADA investigation of doping. According to Tygart, an adverse finding against her as a first offense could still be assessed as a two year suspension, which is half of the suspension time which could be assessed for adults.

Although Russia as a country is currently banned from participating in international skating events due to the 2022 Russian invasion of Ukraine, Valieva has continued to compete within Russian borders without being hindered by RUSADA as recently as the Russian Grand Prix held in October 2022. In mid-November, WADA requested that CAS take up the review of the Valieva case with an eye towards a 4-year suspension of Valieva, which would exclude her from competition at the next Winter Olympics, and to rescind her first place performance at the previous Beijing Olympics because, "the Russian Anti-Doping Agency (RUSADA) did not meet a WADA-imposed Nov. 4 deadline to deliver a verdict on Valiyeva's case."

Notes

References

External links 
 
 Results
 Official Results Book – Figure Skating

Figure skating at the 2022 Winter Olympics
2022
2022 Winter Olympics events
Winter Olympics
International figure skating competitions hosted by China